Aliabad-e Abgarm (also Romanized as ‘Alīābād-e Ābgarm; also known as ‘Alīābād) is a village in Hamaijan Rural District, Hamaijan District, Sepidan County, Fars Province, Iran. At the 2006 census, its population was 105, in 31 families.

References 

Populated places in Sepidan County